Daniel Merlin Goodbrey is an English writer known for his work in webcomics and the British small press.

Biography
Goodbrey became known as a creator of experimental digital comics and hypercomics.

He is the inventor of the Tarquin engine, an Adobe Flash script for creating infinite canvas webcomics. Cartoonist Scott McCloud has used the Tarquin engine for the creation of some of his comics.

His recent works include Iron Man 2020 for Marvel Comics.

Goodbrey currently lives in Welwyn Garden City where he lectures in Narrative & Interaction Design at The University of Hertfordshire.

His work was featured in a group exhibition at Pump House Gallery in London in September 2010.

Bibliography
 Six-Gun: Tales of an Unfolded Earth (Hyperfiction) 
 I Bleed Scorpions (British small press comic) 
 Mr. Nile - The Illustrated Bastard (British small press comic) 
 Brainfist (webcomic)
 All Knowledge is Strange (webcomic)
 The Last Sane Cowboy and Other Stories (AiT/Planet Lar)
 "Emperor None" (with Brian Denham, in Giant-Size Avengers Special #1, Marvel Comics, February 2008)
 Iron Man 2020: "Endless Stolen Sky" (with art by Lou Kang, in Astonishing Tales #1-6, Marvel Comics, April–September 2009)
 The Rule of Death (with art by Douglas Noble, webcomic, Serializer)
 Necessary Monsters (with art by Sean Azzopardi, webcomic)

Awards
 Isotope Award for Excellence in mini-comics in 2004
 Isotope Award for Excellence in 2005 for 'The Last Sane Cowboy'

Notes

References

External links

 Daniel Merlin Goodbrey at Comic Vine

Interviews
 CR Sunday Interview: Daniel Merlin Goodbrey
 Return to Camelot: An Interview with Daniel Merlin Goodbrey

Living people
English comics writers
English webcomic creators
Year of birth missing (living people)